Crime in the U.S. state of Virginia has generally decreased from 2008 to 2014.

Summary 
Overall, there were 177,060 crimes reported in 2014 in Virginia, including 338 murders and homicides.

In 2012 Virginia had the 3rd-lowest rape rate by state after New Jersey and New York.

The state has significantly lower crime rates than demographically similar neighboring states Maryland, North Carolina, and Tennessee.

By location

Hampton Roads
In 2013, Hampton Roads had the highest crime rate by region in the state.

Richmond
In 2012, Richmond had 42 murders, a murder rate of 20.2 per 100,000.

In 2007, the FBI Uniform Crime Reports ranked Richmond as the 5th worst city for violent crimes with populations of 100,000 to 250,000. Today Richmond is not in the top 25 of violent crime or murder.

Capital punishment laws

Capital punishment was abolished in this state when Governor Ralph Northam signed a bill into law on March 24, 2021. Before that date, both the electric chair and lethal injection were used to execute prisoners.

State and federal officials could opt to send violent criminals to face trial in Virginia rather than their current state due to Virginia judges being more willing to carry out execution.

See also
 Law of Virginia

References